An industry day is an event held by a military to present requirements to industry representatives for weapons or vehicles. Common presentation methods include outlines by PowerPoint. Industry days are usually held in succession with each event holding fewer people as contractors drop their bids.

Military equipment